Carex leersii, the grassland sedge or many-leaved sedge, is a widespread species of flowering plant in the family Cyperaceae. It is native to the Atlas Mountains in Africa, Europe, the Middle East, Central Asia, the Altai and the western Himalayas, and has been introduced to New Zealand. It is a member of the Carex muricata group, and prefers to grow in sunny, relatively dry locations.

References

leersii
Flora of Morocco
Flora of Algeria
Flora of Europe
Flora of the Caucasus
Flora of Western Asia
Flora of Central Asia
Flora of Altai (region)
Flora of West Himalaya
Plants described in 1870